Calosirus is a genus of beetles belonging to the family Curculionidae.

The genus was first described by Thomson in 1859.

The species of this genus are found in Europe.

Species:
 Calosirus apicalis
 Calosirus terminatus

References

Ceutorhynchini
Curculionidae genera